The World Group II was the second highest level of Fed Cup competition in 2016. The winning nations advanced to the World Group Play-offs, and the losing nations were relegated to the World Group II Play-offs.

Slovakia vs. Australia

Serbia vs. Spain

United States vs. Poland

Canada vs. Belarus

References 

World Group II